Ilya Syarheyevich Shymanovich (born 2 August 1994) is a Belarusian swimmer. He is the world record holder in the short course 100 metre breaststroke and a former world record holder in the short course 50 metre breaststroke. At the 2018 World Championships he won two silver medals, one each in the 100 metre breaststroke and the 50 metre breaststroke. He won two gold medals, one in the 50 metre breaststroke and one in the 200 metre breaststroke, and a silver medal, in the 100 metre breaststroke, at the 2021 European Short Course Championships. At the 2021 World Short Course Championships he won the gold medal in the 100 metre breaststroke.

Career

2017 World Championships
At the 2017 World Aquatics Championships in Budapest, Hungary, Shymanovich competed in the men's 50 metre breaststroke event.

2018 World Championships
Competing on the global level at the 2018 World Short Course Championships in Hangzhou, China, Shymanovich won his first medal of the meet in the 100 metre breaststroke, finishing in a time of 56.10 seconds that was nine hundredths of a second behind the gold medalist and then-world-record-holder in the event Cameron van der Burgh of South Africa to earn the silver medal. In his next individual event, the 200 metre breaststroke, Shymanovich placed twelfth overall with a time of 2:04.85 in the prelims heats, which did not advance him to the final. For his final individual event, the 50 metre breaststroke, Shymanovich once again won the silver medal, placing second with a time of 25.77 seconds only behind Cameron van der Burgh.

2020 Belarus National Championships
In December 2020, at the short course Belarus National Championships in Brest, Shymanovich swam a world record time of 55.34 seconds in the 100 metre breaststroke, breaking the world record of 55.41 seconds set by Adam Peaty of Great Britain approximately one month earlier.

2020 European Championships
At the 2020 European Aquatics Championships held in Budapest, Hungary in May 2021 and conducted in long course metres, Shymanovich competed in the 50 metre breaststroke winning the silver medal in the event with a time of 26.55 seconds, which was less than four tenths of a second behind the gold medalist in the event, Adam Peaty of Great Britain.

2021 European Short Course Championships

Shymanovich won the gold medal and tied the world record of 25.25 seconds in the 50 metre breaststroke, set in 2009 by Cameron van der Burgh of South Africa, on the last day of the 2021 European Short Course Swimming Championships, held at the Palace of Water Sports in Kazan, Russia in November. His time of 25.25 seconds also set a new European record, Belarusian record, and Championships record in the event. He backed up his world record in the 50 metre breaststroke on the finals relay in the mixed 4x50 metre medley relay, where he swam the fastest 50 metre breaststroke relay split in history with a time of 24.72 seconds and helped the relay place fifth overall.

Earlier in the Championships meet and leading up to his world record, Shymanovich set a new Championships record in the 100 metre breaststroke in the semifinals with a time of 55.45 seconds that advanced him to the final ranked first. In the final of the 100 metre breaststroke he swam a 55.77 and earned the silver medal in the event, with neither him nor the gold medalist, Nicolò Martinenghi of Italy, matching nor surpassing his time from the semifinals in the final, meaning his Championships record remained unbroken through the Championships. After his silver medal win in the 100 metre breaststroke and before his gold medal win in the 50 metre breaststroke, Shymanovich won his first gold medal of the Championships in the 200 metre breaststroke with a time of 2:01.73 in the final. Shymanovich equalling the world record in the 50 metre breaststroke was ranked as number one for "The Week That Was" honor from Swimming World for the week of 8 November 2021 along with Szebasztián Szabó of Hungary equalling the world record in the 50 metre butterfly.

2021 International Swimming League
In his second playoffs season match of the 2021 International Swimming League, Shymanovich lowered the world record he set in the short course 100 metre breaststroke in 2020 at 55.34 seconds to a time of 55.32 seconds. Prior to setting the world record, Shymanovich narrowly outperformed Sarah Sjöström, also swimming representing the Energy Standard Swim Club, to win the match most valuable player, MVP, honour in the first playoffs match of the season. Earlier, during the regular season, Shymanovich won his first match most valuable player honour of the year in the eighth match of the regular season. In the fifth playoffs match, sixteenth match of the whole season, Shymanovhich lowered his own world record in the 100 metre breaststroke with a time of 55.28 seconds. For the sixteenth match he also won match most valuable player honors with a total score of 83.5 points. Shymanovich's new world record was the number one item for "The Week That Was" honour. He won a total of 16 breaststroke events throughout the 2021 season. Shymanovich ranked fifth out of 488 competitors at the end of the 2021 season for the total number of most valuable player points earned by a competitor in the duration of the International Swimming League with 711.5 points. With his world records in the 50 metre and 100 metre breaststroke from 2021, Shymanovich was the only swimmer to set a world record in two or more individual events for the year.

2021 World Short Course Championships

Shymanovich entered to compete in the 50 metre, 100 metre, and 200 metre breaststroke individual events at the 2021 World Short Course Championships in Abu Dhabi, United Arab Emirates. In the prelims heats of the 100 metre breaststroke, Shymanovich ranked second overall with a time of 56.20 seconds and qualified for the semifinals later in the day. For the semifinals, Shymanovich ranked third with a 56.54, qualifying for the final the next day. Shymanovich won the gold medal in the final of the 100 metre breaststroke in a Championships record time of 55.70 seconds. With his win, Shymanovich earned his first world title. On the third day of competition, Shymanovich ranked tenth overall in the prelims heats of the 200 metre breaststroke with a 2:04.99 and did not qualify for the final. In the evening, Shymanovich split a 24.93 for the breaststroke leg of the 4×50 metre mixed medley relay in the final, helping achieve a fifth place finish of 1:37.97. Day five, Shymanovich qualified for the semifinals of the 50 metre breaststroke ranking first in the prelims heats with a time of 25.77 seconds. In the semifinals he ranked first, qualifying for the final with a 25.55. On the sixth and final day, Shymanovich placed fourth in the final of the 50 metre breaststroke with a time of 25.84 seconds.

2022
Towards the beginning of the 2022 season, Shymanovich and all other Belarusians, and Russians, were banned indefinitely from LEN competitions, effective 3 March 2022, and banned from FINA competitions in the time frame of 21 April to 31 December 2022. Gaining international competition experience at the 2022 Russian Solidarity Games instead, an international sporting competition with athletes from multiple sports and multiple countries, he won the gold medal in the short course 50 metre breaststroke at the second swimming portion of the Games, held in November, with a time of 25.94 seconds, which was 0.04 seconds ahead of silver medalist Kirill Prigoda of Russia and 0.09 seconds ahead of bronze medalist Kirill Strelnikov of Russia. Earlier in the competition, he won a silver medal in the 100 metre breaststroke with a time of 56.26 seconds to finish 0.01 seconds behind Danil Semyaninov of Russia.

International championships (50 m)

International championships (25 m)

World records

Short course metres (25 m pool)

Awards and honours
 Swimming World, International Swimming League Swimmer of the Year (male): 2021
 SwimSwam, Top 100 (Men's): 2022 (#18)
 International Swimming League, Match Most Valuable Player: 2021 Match 8, 2021 Match 12, 2021 Match 16
 Swimming World, The Week That Was: 8 November 2021 (#1), 29 November 2021 (#1)

See also
 List of World Swimming Championships (25 m) medalists (men)
 List of European Aquatics Championships medalists in swimming (men)
 List of European Short Course Swimming Championships medalists (men)

References

External links
 

1994 births
Living people
World record setters in swimming
World record holders in swimming
Belarusian male swimmers
Male medley swimmers
Male breaststroke swimmers
Medalists at the 2017 Summer Universiade
Place of birth missing (living people)
Universiade medalists in swimming
Universiade gold medalists for Belarus
European Aquatics Championships medalists in swimming
Swimmers at the 2020 Summer Olympics
Olympic swimmers of Belarus
Medalists at the FINA World Swimming Championships (25 m)